The CSX Grand Rapids Subdivision in a railroad right-of-way in Western Michigan. The line runs from Porter, Indiana to Grand Rapids, Michigan. The subdivision utilizes the Norfolk Southern Railway (NS)) Chicago Line from Pine Junction to CP482 (Porter), where it diverges off toward Grand Rapids. The line was originally created by the Chicago & Michigan Lake Shore Railroad and the Grand Rapids & Holland Railroad, later the C&O/Pere Marquette Railway, It has gone through two major mergers including the Chessie System and CSX mergers. Connecting the CSX Plymouth Subdivision to Chicago, the Grand Rapids Subdivision is a vital part of the Michigan Rail Network. The rail line featured Canadian Pacific (SOO) run through trains until 2010 when they are rerouted over the NS Chicago Line. It has connections to two Class-III, short-line carriers (WMI and MS) and many customers including J. H. Campbell Generating Plant.

Interlocking towers location 
Porter: Interlocking with NYCRR
Roundhouse(Michigan City): Former crossing with Monon Michigan City Branch, abandoned 1980.
St. Joseph: Bridge over St. Joseph River.

Railfanning Information

Stations 
These stations are all serviced by the Amtrak Pere Marquette(370/371) Twice a day(Once to Grand Rapids[370], Once to Chicago[371])

Café services are available

These are estimated times and shouldn't be depended on**

Railcams 
There is a webcam in Bangor, Michigan, hosted by Horizon Broadband.

Signals 
The Grand Rapids Subdivision uses Safetran signals with satellite/cellular communication; CTC is in use.

Yard Locations

Wyoming Yard - Grand Rapids, MI

Waverly Yard - Holland, MI

New Buffalo Yard - New Buffalo, MI (currently unused)

Radio and dispatcher frequencies 
Radio Frequency - 160.230 (AAR Channel 08)
Dispatcher - 160.635 (AAR Channel 35)

Train symbols/frequencies 

Extra Movements/Late Trains may run with a different symbol that isn't listed*

Mileposts

Scanner Information

Scanner frequencies

ATCS Availability 
The CSX Grand Rapids sub is unavailable for use by ATCS-Monitor because the subdivision uses satellite/cellular communication. However, You can view the switch onto the Grand Rapids Sub in Porter, Indiana by viewing the Norfolk Southern Chicago Line.

References

External links 
 RailroadFan.com
 ChicagoRailfan.com
 RadioReference.com

Grand Rapids, Michigan
Norfolk Southern Railway